The Second Best Exotic Marigold Hotel is a 2015 comedy-drama film directed by John Madden and written by Ol Parker. It is the sequel to the 2011 sleeper hit film The Best Exotic Marigold Hotel and features an ensemble cast consisting of stars Judi Dench, Maggie Smith, Dev Patel, Bill Nighy, Celia Imrie, Penelope Wilton, Ronald Pickup, David Strathairn, and Richard Gere.

Plot
Muriel Donnelly and Sonny Kapoor travel to San Diego, California to propose a plan to hotel magnate Ty Burley for buying and opening a second hotel in India as a companion to the Best Exotic Marigold Hotel. They are told that a company inspector will anonymously visit India to evaluate the project.

Back in Jaipur, Evelyn Greenslade is offered a job as a fabric buyer. She is concerned that at age 79, the job will require many responsibilities and considerable travel. Douglas Ainslie, who is in love with Evelyn, is worried about losing time with her as well, and also eager to introduce her to his daughter.

Sonny's life becomes complicated by plans for his upcoming wedding to Sunaina, plus a possible rival for her affections and his business interests. He is also desperate to impress American visitor Guy Chambers, whom he immediately identifies as the American hotel chain's anonymous inspector. Noting the interest Guy has taken in Sonny's mother, he encourages a romantic relationship between them at first, then angrily resents it when he concludes Guy is not the inspector after all.

Madge Hardcastle's dilemma is deciding between two suitors from India and which to wed. Norman Cousins becomes frantic when he believes a local taxi driver mistakenly assumed Norman wanted a fatal accident to befall his current sweetheart, Carol, but then discovers that she has been sleeping with other men. And Douglas' daughter arrives for a visit with his estranged wife Jean (who returned to the UK at the end of the previous film) seeking a divorce so that she can remarry.

Muriel, while having received bad news from a medical appointment, struggles to keep Sonny from ruining his wedding, his business and his future, having become quite fond of him. Decisions come to a head for all during the colourful wedding of Sonny and Sunaina.

Cast

Production
On 29 October 2012, Vulture reported that screenwriter Ol Parker was consulted to deliver a treatment to Fox Searchlight Pictures executives for a sequel titled The Best Exotic Marigold Hotel 2. Most of the cast agreed to come back. On 28 October 2013, Radio Times revealed that the cast would be flying to India to shoot the sequel film in January 2014.

Casting
On 28 October 2013 Radio Times stated that Penelope Wilton confirmed the cast, including Judi Dench, Bill Nighy, Maggie Smith, Ronald Pickup and Celia Imrie, would return for the sequel, set to start filming in January 2014. On 30 October, Deadline reported that Richard Gere was in talks to join the ensemble cast of the sequel. Later on 10 January 2014, Gere confirmed his new role in the film; other newcomers added to the film include Tamsin Greig and David Strathairn.

Filming
Principal photography began on 10 January 2014 in Jaipur, India.

Marketing
The first trailer was released on 7 August 2014, with the title The Second Best Exotic Marigold Hotel announced.

Release
The film had its world premiere at the Royal Film performance on Tuesday 17 February 2015, an event held in aid of the Film & TV Charity. Subsequently, the film was released in the United Kingdom, Australia, New Zealand and Ireland on 26 February 2015, and in the United States on 6 March 2015.

Music

After the success of the first part, Thomas Newman returned to compose music for the sequel. The Soundtrack Album consisting of 28 tracks was released on 20 February 2015. The Soundtrack included various songs by Indian Artists including Pritam, Himesh Reshammiya and Shankar–Ehsaan–Loy.

Reception

Box office
The Second Best Exotic Marigold Hotel  grossed $33.1 million in North America and $52.9 million in other territories for a total gross of $86 million, against a budget of $10 million.

The Second Best Exotic Marigold Hotel topped the UK box office during its first week, earning £3.8 million. It stayed top of the UK box office chart for a second week, grossing over £1.9 million and held on to the top spot for the third week in a row, fended off competition from latest Liam Neeson actioner, Run All Night, and claimed £1.4 million in total. In the United States, it opened strong at number three at the US box office with an estimated $8.6 million in its first weekend of release. During its opening weekend, the film also scored the highest average gross of any film in wide release, averaging $5,467 from 1,573 theaters.

Critical reception
On Rotten Tomatoes the film has an approval rating of rating of 65%, based on 185 reviews, with an average rating of 6/10. The site's consensus reads, "The Second Best Exotic Marigold Hotel is about as original as its title—but with a cast this talented and effortlessly charming, that hardly matters." On Metacritic the film has a weighted average score of 51 out of 100, based on 36 critics, indicating "mixed or average reviews". Audiences polled by CinemaScore gave the film a grade of "B+" on an A+ to F scale.

Peter Debruge of Variety wrote: "It’s not so common to find an ensemble of this caliber so enthusiastic to work together, and that chemistry comes across."
Leslie Felper of The Hollywood Reporter called it "a sluggish also-ran compared to its predecessor."

See also

 List of British films of 2015

References

External links
 
 
 

2015 films
2015 comedy-drama films
British independent films
British comedy-drama films
American independent films
American comedy-drama films
Films scored by Thomas Newman
Films directed by John Madden
Films based on British novels
Films set in hotels
Films set in India
Films shot in India
British sequel films
American sequel films
Fox Searchlight Pictures films
TSG Entertainment films
Films shot in Rajasthan
Films set in Rajasthan
Films produced by Graham Broadbent
2015 independent films
2010s English-language films
2010s American films
2010s British films